Legoland Dubai (stylized as LEGOLAND Dubai) is a theme park in Dubai. It opened on October 31, 2016. It is the first Legoland park in the Middle East and was the seventh worldwide. The park was originally scheduled to open in 2011 in Dubailand as Legoland Dubailand, but was then delayed until October 2016 and is now located at Dubai Parks and Resorts as Legoland Dubai.

The park is designed for families with children from ages 12 years old and younger. The park also provides a variety of rides and activities. Like many other Legoland theme parks, Dubai's includes a Miniland where over 20 million Lego bricks are used to create 15,000 miniature models of different landmarks and structures around the world.

Roller coasters

Themed lands
Legoland Dubai has six themed lands: Factory, Lego City, Imagination, Kingdoms, Adventure, and Miniland. Each of the lands have unique rides and scenery built around its respective theme.

Tickets and rates
Legoland Dubai offers single-day tiger Tickets, as well as annual tickets.

Expo 2020
Dubai on target to attract 20 million tourists annually by 2020, the Dubai Tourism Authority sees its theme parks Legoland as crucial in maintaining visitors. The renovations projects are going in full stream with cooperation with Benjamin moore middle east to add to the charm of the Dubai Expo 2020. The multi-park complex is expected to attract 6.7 million visitors, which is in line with Dubai's vision to entice 20 million international tourists to its shores every year even after Expo 2020.

References

External links

Legoland
Buildings and structures in Dubai
Amusement parks in Dubai
Tourist attractions in Dubai
Amusement parks opened in 2016
2016 establishments in the United Arab Emirates